François Leclerc du Tremblay (4 November 1577 – 17 December 1638), also known as Père Joseph, was a French Greyfriar, confidant and agent of Cardinal Richelieu. He was the original éminence grise—the French term ("grey eminence") for a powerful advisor or decision-maker who operates secretly or unofficially.

Biography
Leclerc was the eldest son of Jean Leclerc du Tremblay, president of the chamber of requests of the parlement of Paris, and of Marie Motier de Lafayette. As a boy he received a careful classical training, and in 1595 made an extended journey through Italy, returning to take up the career of arms. He served at the Siege of Amiens in 1597 and then accompanied a special embassy to London.

In 1599, under the name Baron de Mafflier, by which he was known at court, on 3 February 1600, he renounced the world and entered the Capuchin priory of Orléans. He embraced the religious life with great ardour, and became a notable preacher and reformer. In 1606 he helped , a nun of Fontevrault, found the reformed order of the Filles du Calvaire, and he wrote a manual of devotion for the nuns. His proselytizing zeal led him to send missionaries to the centres of the Huguenot movement.

He entered politics at the Conference of Loudun. There, as the confidant of the queen and the papal envoy, he opposed the Gallicanism advanced by the parlement. He succeeded in convincing the princes that the stance harbored schismatic tendencies and they abandoned their initial support. In 1612 he established those personal relations with Richelieu that established his reputation—and the phrase—éminence grise, though historical research has not been able to document his supposed influence on the latter. The description drew on the grey friar's cloak that Père Joseph wore and the title "eminence" conferred on Richelieu as a cardinal.

In 1627 Père Joseph was present at the siege of La Rochelle. A purely religious reason also made him Richelieu's ally against the Habsburgs. He had a dream of arousing Europe to another crusade against the Ottoman Empire and believed that the Habsburgs were an obstacle to making this possible. For Richelieu, he manoeuvered at the Diet of Regensburg (1630) to thwart the aggression of the Habsburg emperor, and then recommended the intervention of Gustavus Adolphus, and the Protestant armies, thereby maintaining a balance of power.

He became a war minister, and, though maintaining a personal austerity of life, devoted himself to diplomacy and politics. He died in 1638, just as he was to be made a cardinal. The story that Richelieu visited him when on his deathbed and roused the dying man by the words, "Courage, Father Joseph, we have won Breisach", is false.

References

Sources

External links
 Article in The Columbia Encyclopedia

 Article from the 1911 Encyclopædia Britannica, 11th Edition

Capuchins
1577 births
1638 deaths
16th-century French people
17th-century French politicians
16th-century Christian monks
17th-century Christian monks
Cardinal Richelieu